Kasey Hill (born December 3, 1993) is an American professional basketball player who last played for Science City Jena of the German ProA. He played college basketball for the Florida Gators.

Early life
Hill was raised by Jeff and Jennie Simmons after his father was sent to prison. He befriended their son, Kyle, in grade school. Hill was named a McDonald's All-American as a senior in high school. He played high school basketball at Montverde Academy alongside future Florida teammate Michael Frazier II.

College career
In Hill's freshman season, Florida reached the Final Four. He was a backup point guard to Scottie Wilbekin. During his time at UF, Hill made 57.7% of his free throws. In the 2016–17 season under Florida coach Mike White, Hill averaged 9.7 points, 2.9 rebounds, 1.7 steals, and 0.1 blocks per game, earning him a spot on the SEC All-Defensive Team. Hill's 2016–17 season was littered with standout performances such as the 22-point defeat of Kentucky on February 4 when he achieved 21 points, 5 rebounds, and 4 assists in front of a sold-out crowd at the newly renovated O'Connell Center.

Professional career
Following the close of his college career, Hill signed with Alba Fehérvár of the Hungarian League on July 21, 2017.

On August 12, 2019, Hill signed with Eisbären Bremerhaven of the German ProA. On August 3, 2020, Hill signed with Wilki Morskie Szczecin of the Polish Basketball League. In six games he averaged 6.0 points, 1.7 rebounds and 3.3 assists per game. Hill parted ways with the team on October 8.

On December 7, 2020, he has signed with Science City Jena of the German ProA.

References

1993 births
Living people
Alba Fehérvár players
American expatriate basketball people in Cyprus
American expatriate basketball people in Hungary
American men's basketball players
APOEL B.C. players
Basketball players from Florida
Florida Gators men's basketball players
McDonald's High School All-Americans
Montverde Academy alumni
People from Umatilla, Florida
Point guards
Science City Jena players
Sportspeople from Lake County, Florida